Panagiotis E. Souganidis (Παναγιώτης E. Σουγανίδης) is an American mathematician, specializing in partial differential equations.

Biography
Souganidis graduated in 1981 with B.A. from the National and Kapodistrian University of Athens. At the University of Wisconsin–Madison he graduated with M.A. in 1981 and Ph.D. in 1984 with thesis under the supervision of Michael G. Crandall. Souganidis was a postdoc in 1984–1985 at the University of Minnesota's Institute for Mathematics and its Applications and was at the Institute for Advanced Study in 1988 and 1990. After holding professorships at Brown University, the University of Wisconsin–Madison, and the University of Texas at Austin, he became in 2008 the Charles H. Swift Distinguished Service Professor in Mathematics at the University of Chicago. He has held visiting positions at academic institutions in Italy, Japan, Greece, France, the UK, and Sweden.

Souganidis is the author or co-author of over 100 publications in refereed journals. His wife is Thaleia Zariphopoulou, a Greek-American mathematician and professor at the University of Texas at Austin.

Awards and honors
 1989 — Sloan Research Fellow
 1994 — Invited Speaker of the International Congress of Mathematicians
 2003 — Highly Cited Researcher
 2012 — Fellow of the American Mathematical Society (Class of 2013)
 2015 — Fellow of the Society for Industrial and Applied Mathematics
 2017 — Fellow of the American Association for the Advancement of Science
 2019 — Invited Speaker of the International Congress on Industrial and Applied Mathematics

Selected publications

References

External links
 International Centre for Theoretical Physics (ICTP) talks by Panagiotis Souganidis, 2018
 
 
 
 

Year of birth missing (living people)
Living people
20th-century American mathematicians
21st-century American mathematicians
American mathematicians
Brown University faculty
Fellows of the American Association for the Advancement of Science
Fellows of the American Mathematical Society
Fellows of the Society for Industrial and Applied Mathematics
Greek emigrants to the United States
National and Kapodistrian University of Athens alumni
PDE theorists
Sloan Research Fellows
University of Chicago faculty
University of Texas at Austin faculty
University of Wisconsin–Madison alumni
University of Wisconsin–Madison faculty